Lukashevich or Lukashevych is an East Slavic surname (Russian: Лукашевич, Belarusian: Лукашэвіч, Ukrainian: Лукашевич). Similar Polish surnames are: Łukasiewicz, Łukaszewicz. 

the surname may refer to:

Olexiy Lukashevych, Ukrainian long jumper
Ivan Lukashevich, Russian Formula Palmer Audi rider
Nadezhda Lukashevich, Russian singer 
Nikolai Lukashevich (1941–2021), Russian military officer

Belarusian-language surnames